
Upwell is a village and civil parish in the English county of Norfolk. Upwell village is on the A1101 road, as is Outwell, its conjoined village at the north. The nearest towns are Wisbech to the north-west and Downham Market to the east.

And most recently, In the 2021 census the town population has nearly doubled to 4,734.

History
The villages name means 'higher well (= spring/stream)'. Originally, part of a single place called Well; 'upp' was appended to distinguish from Outwell.

Upwell in 1202 had a market-place and a weekly market. Marmont Priory was endowed by Richard I with 300 acres in Upwell and Outwell. The priory of Gilbertines was founded in the reign of King John. Cultivation of flax and hemp is referred to in an order of Sessions of Sewers in 1340.
Upwell was connected with Wisbech by a steam tramway in 1884

William Wolsey a constable of Upwell, Outwell & Welney (and Robert Piggot of Wisbech) Protestants were tried at Ely for heresy and burnt at the stake in 1555.

In 1810 a building was being used as a temporary theatre by Joseph Smedley at a cost of five Guineas. 

In 1869 Upwell St. Peter, was the richest benefice of the English church, being returned in the clergy list as worth £3,058 a year, though worth considerably more, and had just become vacant by the death of the Rev. Wm. Gale Townley, who had held it only seven years. The living was in the gift of Mr. B. G. Townley. In the same parish is the rectory of Christ Church, returned as being worth £1,594 year, also belonging to the Townley family.

Governance
Upwell has a parish council. The councillors elect a chair.
Upwell falls within the electoral ward of Upwell and Delph. The population of this ward at the 2011 Census was 4,827.

For the purposes of local government, it falls within the district of King's Lynn and West Norfolk. Until 1974 it formed part of the now-defunct Marshland Rural District in Norfolk.

Further reading

References

External links

GENUKI(tm) page

Villages in Norfolk
King's Lynn and West Norfolk
Civil parishes in Norfolk